Alex Rosenberg (born September 20, 1991) is an American-Israeli former basketball player who last played for Hapoel Afula of the Liga Leumit. He played college basketball for Columbia University.

High school and college career
Rosenberg attended Millburn High School in Millburn, New Jersey, where he was a three-year letterwinner, and two-time first team all-area. Alex is fourth on the all-time scoring list for Millburn High School.

Rosenberg went on to play one year of postgrad basketball at The Peddie School after high school. There, he averaged 14.0 ppg.

Rosenberg played college basketball for Columbia University's Lions. In his senior year at Columbia, he averaged 13.5 points, 4.1 rebounds and 1.9 assists per game.

On March 9, 2016, Rosenberg was named All-Ivy League Honorable Mention.

Professional career
On July 20, 2016, Rosenberg started his professional career with Maccabi Kiryat Gat of the Israeli Premier League, signing a two-year deal. On May 8, 2017, Rosenberg recorded a season-high 18 points, shooting 7-of-11 from the field, along with four assists in a 101–95 win over Bnei Herzliya.

On July 23, 2017, Rosenberg signed a three-year deal with Bnei Herzliya. However, on December 28, 2017, Rosenberg parted ways with Herzliya and joined Hapoel Afula of the Liga Leumit for the rest of the season. In 19 games played for Afula, he averaged 16.2 points, 5 rebounds and 2.7 assists per game.

Rosenberg retired from professional basketball in 2018 after his season with Hapoel Afula.

Personal life
Alex grew up in Short Hills, New Jersey. His father, Marc, played college basketball at Northeastern and Western New England College.

References

External links
 Columbia bio
 RealGM profile
 EuroBasket profile

1991 births
Living people
American expatriate basketball people in Israel
Bnei Hertzeliya basketball players
Columbia Lions men's basketball players
Hapoel Afula players
Israeli men's basketball players
Israeli people of American descent
Maccabi Kiryat Gat B.C. players
Millburn High School alumni
People from Millburn, New Jersey
Power forwards (basketball)
American men's basketball players